Sedan is the county seat of and the largest city in Chautauqua County, Kansas, United States.  As of the 2020 census, the population of the city was 1,000.

History

Sedan was founded in 1871. The city was named in commemoration of the 1870 Battle of Sedan. Sedan was incorporated as a city in 1876.

Geography
Sedan is located at  (37.128472, -96.186220), which is approximately the middle-point between New York City and Los Angeles.

Climate
The climate in this area is characterized by hot, humid summers and generally mild to cool winters.  According to the Köppen Climate Classification system, Sedan has a humid subtropical climate, abbreviated "Cfa" on climate maps.

Demographics

2010 census
As of the census of 2010, there were 1,124 people, 482 households, and 269 families residing in the city. The racial makeup of the city was 91.3% White, 0.4% African American, 2.8% Native American, 0.1% Asian, 0.2% Pacific Islander, 2.2% from other races, and 3.0% from two or more races. Hispanic or Latino of any race were 5.2% of the population.

There were 482 households, of which 25.5% had children under the age of 18 living with them, 40.9% were married couples living together, 11.0% had a female householder with no husband present, 3.9% had a male householder with no wife present, and 44.2% were non-families. 40.5% of all households were made up of individuals, and 19.1% had someone living alone who was 65 years of age or older. The average household size was 2.19 and the average family size was 2.86.

The median age in the city was 48.1 years. 21.6% of residents were under the age of 18; 6.7% were between the ages of 18 and 24; 18.2% were from 25 to 44; 26.5% were from 45 to 64; and 26.8% were 65 years of age or older. The gender makeup of the city was 47.3% male and 52.7% female.

2000 census
As of the census of 2000, there were 1,342 people, 560 households, and 346 families residing in the city. The racial makeup of the city was 93.44% White, 0.52% African American, 3.35% Native American, 0.22% Asian, 0.15% Pacific Islander, 0.45% from other races, and 1.86% from two or more races. Hispanic or Latino of any race were 2.09% of the population.

There were 560 households, out of which 23.9% had children under the age of 18 living with them, 48.9% were married couples living together, 10.0% had a female householder with no husband present, and 38.2% were non-families. 35.2% of all households were made up of individuals, and 18.4% had someone living alone who was 65 years of age or older. The average household size was 2.25 and the average family size was 2.90.

In the city, the population was spread out, with 23.0% under the age of 18, 7.9% from 18 to 24, 21.3% from 25 to 44, 19.8% from 45 to 64, and 27.9% who were 65 years of age or older. The median age was 43 years. For every 100 females, there were 83.8 males. For every 100 females age 18 and over, there were 80.6 males.

The median income for a household in the city was $24,324, and the median income for a family was $32,574. Males had a median income of $21,490 versus $19,261 for females. The per capita income for the city was $14,153. About 6.8% of families and 11.1% of the population were below the poverty line, including 13.0% of those under age 18 and 9.5% of those age 65 or over.

Education
Sedan is served by Chautauqua County USD 286 public school district, and its Sedan Jr/Sr High School is located in Sedan.  Schools in Chautauqua County were consolidated through school unification.

Prior to school unification, the Sedan Blue Devils won the Kansas State High School class B baseball championship in 1973 and 2011.

Area attractions 
 Emmett Kelly Museum is located in Sedan, honoring native son, circus clown Emmett Kelly.
 Butcher Falls

Notable people
 Emmett Kelly, circus performer
 Elmer Riggs, paleontologist who died here
 Cassius Shartel, U.S. Representative of Missouri
 William Sproul, U.S. Representative of Kansas
 Charlie Weatherbie, college football coach

Twin City
Sedan, Kansas has a partnership with the village of Sedan, France. Sedan is located in the Ardennes in Northern France.

See also
 Tallgrass Beef Company

References

Further reading

External links

 City of Sedan
 Sedan - Directory of Public Officials
 USD 286, local school district
 Sedan city map, KDOT

Cities in Kansas
County seats in Kansas
Cities in Chautauqua County, Kansas
1871 establishments in Kansas
Populated places established in 1871